Kerala Fire and Rescue Services Academy (Malayalam:കേരള ഫയര്‍ ആന്‍റ് റെസ്ക്യൂ സര്‍വ്വീസസ് അക്കാദമി) is situated in Ramavarmapuram in  Thrissur city, Kerala of India. The academy is the official fire training institution for the Kerala Fire And Rescue Services.

History
Earlier, Fort Kochi based institute trains fireman for Kerala Fire Dept. On 4 June 2007, then Chief Minister of Kerala V. S. Achuthanandan inaugurated the new academy. The academy is situated near to Central Prison, Viyyur in eight acres land. Training for fireman was started on 22 October 2007. The first batch of 225 fireman-driver-cum-pump operators passed out on 4 July 2013.

Courses

The academy offers Basic training for Fire and  Rescue Officer, Fire and rescue Officer(Driver) and inservice courses of Senior Fire and Rescue Officer,Senior Fire and Rescue Officer(Mechanic), Assistant Station Officer.  In addition, there are practical courses also. The academy can train and accommodate 350 trainees in the institute and the hostel. An Olympic type swimming pool is here for training.

References

External links 

Education in Kerala
Education in Thrissur
Law enforcement in Kerala
Organisations based in Thrissur
Educational institutions established in 2007
Firefighting academies
2007 establishments in Kerala